The Heart of Iowa Conference is a high school athletic conference in central Iowa that dates back to the 1970s. Members are a mixture between 3A and 2A, the second- and third-largest classes.

Current members

History
The conference was formed in 1966 by Ballard, Nevada, South Hamilton,Perry Community School and West Marshall after the disbanding of the Hawkeye Central Conference.

In 1967, Carlisle, Johnston and North Polk joined, and in 1970, Roland–Story joined from the West Central Conference.

As of 1992, the league had 10 schools in it. Bondurant–Farrar, Colfax–Mingo–Baxter, Colo–NESCO, Gilbert, Madrid, Ogden, and Woodward-Granger had joined, while Carlisle, Johnston, Nevada, and North Polk had departed.

Colfax–Mingo and Pleasantville were added to the conference in 1997, following the demise of the Des Moines River Conference. Pleasantville then left the league in 2001, and North Polk rejoined. In 2006, Prairie City-Monroe joined the league from the South Central Conference. In 2007, Madrid left for the West Central Conference and was replaced by former Raccoon River Conference member Jefferson-Scranton. In 2008, West Marshall left for the NICL. The 2009 season saw Woodward-Granger jump to the West Central Conference and Nevada re-joined the league from the Raccoon River Conference. In the 2010 season, Colo–NESCO jumped to Iowa Star Conference in every sport except sharing with CMB in soccer. Ogden left the conference in 2011, in order to join former conference foes Woodward-Granger and Madrid in the West Central Conference. Bondurant-Farrar made the jump to Raccoon River Conference starting in the 2011–12 school year. Grandview Park Baptist left the Heart of Iowa Conference before the softball season to go to Rolling Hills Conference. Saydel joined the conference beginning in the fall of the 2012–13 school year. In 2015, Colfax–Mingo left for the South Iowa Cedar League.

In 2017–18 season, Collins-Maxwell & Baxter split up their sharing agreement and both schools went to the Iowa Star Conference.

In 2018, both Gilbert and North Polk agreed to leave the HOIC for the Raccoon River Conference in the 2020–21 school year. Perry, a member of the RRC, was potentially looking to join the HOIC in exchange.

External links
 Official site

References

High school sports in Iowa